Frequency bias may refer to:
 Frequency illusion, a cognitive bias.
 A coefficient of the area control error in an electrical grid.
 Islanding detection method in an electrical grid.